Júlio Eduardo Zamith Carrilho (1946 – 5 December 2021) was a Mozambican politician and long-time member of FRELIMO. Carrilho studied architecture in Mozambique and was the Minister for Public Works during the single party era after independence.

References

External links
 Short bio at fdc.org/mz

1946 births
2021 deaths
FRELIMO politicians
Government ministers of Mozambique
Date of birth missing
Date of death missing